Erinaceusyllis ettiennei is a species belonging to the phylum Annelida, a group known as the segmented worms. E. ettiennei is characterized by its compound chaetae with slender and thin blades, which are curved as a sabre. The most similar species is Erinaceusyllis serratosetosa, but is differentiated by the size of its body and the compound chaetae, which have long and curved marginal spines on its long blades in E. serratosetosa. The species is named in honour of Ettienne Fourie.

Description
Its prostomium is oval, showing 4 large eyes in a trapezoidal arrangement, as well as 2 anterior eyespots. Its antennae have bulbous bases and short tips, its median antenna about the same length as the prostomium and palps put together. The palps are similar in length to the prostomium, being fused along their length, and containing a distal notch.

Its peristomium is similar to the segments that succeed it, being somewhat bilobed. Its tentacular cirri and antennae are alike, but smaller, the dorsal cirri shorter than the antennae but longer than the former, being absent on chaetiger 2.

It shows slender and unidentate blades within heteromorphic compound chaetae, the longer blades provided with thin spines. Its parapodia count with 2 compound chaetae each, with a long blade on its midbody measuring about 48-53µm, while another 6 are provided with sabre-like blades. Erinaceusyllis ettiennei shows simple, dorsal chaetae from midbody, unidentate and smooth; its ventral simple chaetae being slender and present on the posterior parapodia. Its acicula is solitary and acuminate, with tiny subdistal spines present.

The pharynx is long and slender, spanning 4 segments. Its pharyngeal tooth is small and is located near the opening of the pharynx, without papillae on its anterior rim. Its proventricle is barrel-shaped, long and wide (spanning 4 segments), with about 22 muscle cell rows. Its pygidium is small, with 2 anal cirri, similar to its dorsal cirri but rather longer, plus a median papilla.

Distribution
Erinaceusyllis ettiennei was first isolated (at a depth of ) from mud in shallow water in Halifax Bay, north of Townsville, Queensland, and is thought to inhabit an extended area in Queensland.

References

Further reading

External links
WORMS entry

Syllidae
Animals described in 2005